Kim Dion Booth (born 1951) is a former Australian politician. He was the leader of the Tasmanian Greens from April 2014 to May 2015, and represented the Division of Bass in the Tasmanian House of Assembly.

Political career
After the 2010 Tasmanian state election, Booth refused to support the Greens-Labor deal, warning that the deal with Labor would hurt the Greens. He held the Greens portfolios of Forests; Energy; Attorney-General and Justice; Small Business; Industry; Racing and Gaming; and Veterans Affairs.

He was re-elected at the 2014 House of Assembly elections, and was subsequently  elected as party leader.

On 20 May 2015, Booth announced he was resigning from Parliament and as leader of the Greens with immediate effect, following the death of his father. His seat in Bass was filled by Andrea Dawkins after the TEC conducted a count back from the 2014 election results.

References

External links
 Kim Booth's maiden speech to parliament
 Page on the Tasmanian Greens website

1951 births
Living people
Australian Greens members of the Parliament of Tasmania
Members of the Tasmanian House of Assembly
21st-century Australian politicians